Abdou Guirassy (born January 12, 1989, in Pikine) is a Senegalese footballer of Guinean origin. He is under contract with Atlético Reguengos.

External links

1989 births
Living people
Senegalese footballers
Association football midfielders
C.D. Nacional players
Expatriate footballers in Portugal
Sertanense F.C. players